The Jacksonville State Gamecocks baseball team is a varsity intercollegiate athletic team of Jacksonville State University in Jacksonville, Alabama, United States. The team is a member of the Atlantic Sun Conference, which is part of the National Collegiate Athletic Association's Division I, since the start of the 2022 season. The Gamecocks play home games at Rudy Abbott Field in Jacksonville, Alabama. The Gamecocks are coached by Jim Case.

Year-by-year results

Major League Baseball
Jacksonville State has had 63 Major League Baseball Draft selections since the draft began in 1965.

See also
List of NCAA Division I baseball programs

References

External links
 

 
Baseball teams established in 1948
1948 establishments in Alabama